Notre Dame Cathedral (French: Cathédrale de Papeete Notre-Dame de L'Immaculée Conception) is a late 19th-century church that serves as the cathedral of the Roman Catholic Archdiocese of Papeete.  It is located close to the waterfront esplanade of the capital city on the rue du Général de Gaulle.

The construction of the cathedral began in the middle of the 19th century and it opened in 1875.  It is the oldest Catholic church in Tahiti and one of Papeete's last remaining examples of early colonial architecture.

History
In the 19th century, France began expanding its colonial empire into Asia and the Pacific Islands, declaring the Kingdom of Tahiti a protectorate in 1842.  French missionaries began arriving in the same year and an apostolic vicariate was established on May 9, 1848.  Construction of the cathedral most likely started after this time and it was completed in 1875.  Named after its famous Parisian counterpart, the cathedral was built near the waterfront in midtown Papeete.

Architecture

Exterior
The entrance of the cathedral features a red steeple at the centre that faces towards Mount Aorai.

Interior
The interior of the church is noted for its mixture of European and local Polynesian features in its design.  This is demonstrated in a full-size woodcarving of the Madonna and Child, the latter of whom is clutching a breadfruit.  This work of art originated from the Marquesas Islands.

The cathedral is also known for its artistic representations of the Stations of the Cross.  Created by Yuel Durnad and St. Fond, the stations incorporate both Tahitian and Roman cultures in the style of dress, but solely depict Polynesian people in the scenes of The Passion.  The artistic style of the paintings was influenced by Paul Gauguin.

References

External links

Location

Buildings and structures in Tahiti
Cathedral
Roman Catholic Ecclesiastical Province of Papeete
Roman Catholic churches completed in 1875
19th-century Roman Catholic church buildings
Roman Catholic cathedrals in French Polynesia